Yevdakovo is a rural locality (a selo) and the administrative center of Yevdakovskoye Rural Settlement, Kamensky District, Voronezh Oblast, Russia. The population was 676 as of 2010. There are 9 streets.

Geography 
Yevdakovo is located 6 km north of Kamenka (the district's administrative centre) by road. Lyapino is the nearest rural locality.

References 

Rural localities in Kamensky District, Voronezh Oblast